Marshchapel is a coastal village and civil parish in the East Lindsey district of Lincolnshire, England. It includes the hamlets of West End and Eskham.

Marshchapel has a village store cum post office, a primary school, and two public houses, the White Horse and The Outback.  

The church, dedicated to St Mary is a Grade I listed building dating from the 15th century with a chancel dating from 1848. St Mary's is often referred to as the "Cathedral of the Marshes". In the churchyard is a cross dating from the 14th century which was originally sited at the crossroads near West End. It is both Grade II listed and a scheduled monument.

Marshchapel Primary School was originally built as a National School and was rebuilt in 1872, and has been known by its current name since September 1999.

Marshchapel was the site of Anglo-Saxon salt-working.

Governance
An electoral ward in the same name exists. This ward stretches south west to Yarburgh with a total population taken at the 2011 Census of 2,194.

References

External links

3649/http://www.marshchapel-village.co.uk/ Marshchapel Village website

Villages in Lincolnshire
Civil parishes in Lincolnshire
East Lindsey District